The 2007 Pendle Borough Council election took place on 3 May 2007 to elect members of Pendle Borough Council in Lancashire, England. One third of the council was up for election and the Liberal Democrats stayed in overall control of the council.

After the election, the composition of the council was
Liberal Democrat 27
Conservative 14
Labour 6
British National Party 1
Vacant 1

Background
Before the election the Liberal Democrats had a majority on the council with 26 seats, compared to 13 for the Conservatives, 5 for Labour, 3 independents and 1 British National Party. There was also one vacant seat after a councillor, Mary Norcross, died in March 2007. The Liberal Democrat majority had been reduced since the 2006 election after 3 councillors left the party to become independents.

17 seats were being contested in the election with the Liberal Democrats defending 8 seats, the Conservatives 6 and independents 3. There were a total of 64 candidates in the election, with the Liberal Democrats and Conservatives contesting every seat. Other parties contesting the election including Labour with 16 candidates, 6 from the British National Party, 3 Green Party and 2 United Kingdom Independence Party. There were also some independent candidates, with 3 being the sitting independent, formerly Liberal Democrat, councillors.

Campaign
Issues in the election included council tax, the environment, phone masts, refuse collection and regeneration. There was also controversy over the candidature of independent Ian Robinson in Waterside, after a Liberal Democrat councillor in the same ward signed his nomination papers.

The election saw a drop of about 3% in the number of voters registered to vote by post to 7,562.

Election result
The results saw the Liberal Democrats stay in control of the council after regaining the 3 independent seats, but losing another 2 seats. This meant they held 27 seats and had an overall majority of 7. The Conservatives gained Boulsworth from the Liberal Democrats by 7 votes after 3 recounts to have 14 seats, while Labour went up to 6 seats after taking Bradley by 226 votes. The British National Party remained on 1 seat, after no other party won any seats in the election. Overall turnout in the election was 44.6%.

Ward results

By-elections between 2007 and 2008
A by-election took place on 28 June 2007 after the death of Liberal Democrat councillor Mary Norcross. Twenty-six-year-old Shelley Franklin held the seat for the Liberal Democrats with a majority of 372 votes over the Conservatives.

References

2007 English local elections
2007
2000s in Lancashire